Cubit is an ancient unit based on the forearm length from the middle finger tip to the elbow bottom.

Cubit may also refer to:

 CUBIT, a multi-touch interface
 Cubit bone or ulna, a bone in the arm
 Cubit (currency), a fictional currency from the 1978 and 2004 TV series Battlestar Galactica
 Cubit, an item in the Mixels cartoon TV series
 Cubits.com, a London-based Bitcoin exchange

See also
 Qubit (disambiguation)
 Cupid